The following is a list of operating systems released by Apple Inc.

Apple computers

Apple II 
 Apple DOS is the first operating system for Apple computers.
 Apple ProDOS
 Apple GS/OS

Apple III 
Apple SOS

Apple Lisa 
 Lisa OS
 MacWorks XL

Macintosh computers

Classic Mac OS 

 System 1
 System 2
 System 3
 System 4
 System Software 5 – also marketed as System 5
 System Software 6 – also marketed as System 6
 System 7 – System 7.5.1 was the first to refer to itself as Mac OS, Mac OS 7.6 was the first to be branded as "Mac OS"
 Mac OS 8
 Mac OS 9 – Mac OS 9.2.2 was the last version of Classic Mac OS

Mac OS X / OS X / macOS 

macOS was previously known as Mac OS X and later OS X.
 Mac OS X Public Beta – code name Kodiak
 Mac OS X 10.0 – code name Cheetah
 Mac OS X 10.1 – code name Puma
 Mac OS X 10.2 – also marketed as Jaguar
 Mac OS X Panther – 10.3
 Mac OS X Tiger – 10.4
 Mac OS X Leopard – 10.5
 Mac OS X Snow Leopard – 10.6
 Mac OS X Lion – 10.7 – also marketed as OS X Lion
 OS X Mountain Lion – 10.8
 OS X Mavericks – 10.9 (free)
 OS X Yosemite – 10.10 (free)
 OS X El Capitan – 10.11 (free)
 macOS Sierra – 10.12 (free) 
 macOS High Sierra – 10.13 (free)
 macOS Mojave – 10.14  (free)
 macOS Catalina – 10.15 (free)
 macOS Big Sur – 11 (free)
 macOS Monterey – 12 (free)
 macOS Ventura – 13 (free)

macOS Server 

macOS Server was previously known as Mac OS X Server and later OS X Server.
 Mac OS X Server 1.0 – code name Hera, also referred to as Rhapsody
 Mac OS X Server 10.0 – code name Cheetah
 Mac OS X Server 10.1 – code name Puma
 Mac OS X Server 10.2 – code name Jaguar
 Mac OS X Server 10.3 – code name Panther
 Mac OS X Server 10.4 – code name Tiger
 Mac OS X Server 10.5 – also marketed as Leopard Server
 Mac OS X Server 10.6 – also marketed as Snow Leopard Server
Starting with Lion, there is no separate Mac OS X Server operating system. Instead the server components are a separate download from the Mac App Store.
 Mac OS X Lion Server – 10.7 – also marketed as OS X Lion Server
 OS X Mountain Lion Server – 10.8 – also marketed as Mountain Lion Server
 OS X Mavericks Server – 10.9 – also marketed as Mavericks Server
 OS X Yosemite Server – 10.10 – also marketed as Yosemite Server 4.0
 OS X 10.11 Server 5.0 – also marketed as OS X Server 5.0
 OS X 10.11 Server 5.1 – also marketed as OS X Server 5.1
 macOS 10.12 Server 5.2 – also marketed as macOS Server 5.2
 macOS 10.12 Server 5.3 – also marketed as macOS Server 5.3
 macOS 10.13 Server 5.4 – also marketed as macOS Server 5.4
 macOS 10.13 Server 5.5 – also marketed as macOS Server 5.5

Other macOS-related releases 
 bridgeOS – powers the Touch Bar and other internal components
 NeXTSTEP
 OPENSTEP
 Darwin

Others 
 A/ROSE
 A/UX
 AIX for Apple Network Servers
 Macintosh Application Environment
 MkLinux
 PowerOpen Environment
 Star Trek – unreleased
 Taligent – unreleased
 Copland – unreleased

Mobile devices

Newton 
 Newton OS

iPod 

 iPod OS

iOS 

iOS was previously known as iPhone OS, despite also being available on the iPod Touch (1st, 2nd, and 3rd generations) and the original iPad.
 iPhone OS 1 – derived from "Mac OS X" (now known as "macOS")
 iPhone OS 2
 iPhone OS 3
 iOS 4 – continued from iPhone OS 3
 iOS 5
 iOS 6
 iOS 7
 iOS 8
 iOS 9
 iOS 10
 iOS 11
 iOS 12
 iOS 13
 iOS 14
 iOS 15
 iOS 16

iPadOS 

At its June 2019 Worldwide Developer Conference, Apple introduced iPadOS, a version of iOS, for iPad tablets, promised for fall 2019 release.
 iPadOS 13 – derived from iOS 13
 iPadOS 14 – derived from iOS 14
 iPadOS 15 – derived from iOS 15
 iPadOS 16 - derived from iOS 16

watchOS 

 watchOS 1 – derived from iOS 8
 watchOS 2 – derived from iOS 9
 watchOS 3 – derived from iOS 10
 watchOS 4 – derived from iOS 11
 watchOS 5 – derived from iOS 12
 watchOS 6 – derived from iOS 13
 watchOS 7 – derived from iOS 14
 watchOS 8 - derived from iOS 15
 watchOS 9 - derived from iOS 16

Living room

Apple TV Software 

 Apple TV Software 1 – derived from Mac OS X 10.4 Tiger
 Apple TV Software 2 – derived from Mac OS X 10.4 Tiger
 Apple TV Software 3 – derived from Mac OS X 10.4 Tiger
 Apple TV Software 4 – derived from iOS 4 and iOS 5
 Apple TV Software 5 – derived from iOS 5 and iOS 6
 Apple TV Software 6 – derived from iOS 7
 Apple TV Software 7 – derived from iOS 8
There was no Apple TV Software 8, version 8 was skipped when moving to tvOS.

tvOS 

 tvOS 9 – derived from iOS 9
 tvOS 10 – derived from iOS 10
 tvOS 11 – derived from iOS 11
 tvOS 12 – derived from iOS 12
 tvOS 13 - derived from iOS 13
 tvOS 14 - derived from iOS 14
 tvOS 15 - derived from iOS 15
 tvOS 16 - derived from iOS 16

audioOS

Table of operating systems

Notes

References

operating systems
 
Apple